George W. Barbier (November 19, 1864 – July 19, 1945) was an American stage and film actor who appeared in 88 films.

Early life and education
Barbier was born in Philadelphia, Pennsylvania.  He entered the Crozer Theological Seminary in Upland, Pennsylvania to study for the ministry but gave it up to go on the stage.

Career

Barbier began his career in light opera and spent several years in repertory and stock companies. He eventually played on Broadway, where he appeared in seven productions between 1922 and 1930, among them The Hunchback of Notre Dame, The Front Page and The Man Who Came Back.

He signed a contract with Paramount Pictures in 1929 and later worked as a character actor for most of the major studios. His first film was The Big Pond (1930). The weighty, white-haired Barbier often played pompous, but mostly kind-hearted businessmen or patriarchs in supporting roles. George Barbier appeared in 88 films until his death in 1945.

Personal life
Barbier married Caroline "Carrie" Thatcher (June 1868, Pennsylvania – June 8, 1939), a stage actress; theirs was reportedly "one of the most successful marriages in Hollywood."

Barbier was originally interred at the Hollywood Forever Cemetery in Los Angeles, California but was disinterred and reburied in Philadelphia, Pennsylvania.

Complete filmography

The Big Pond (1930) as Mr. Billings
The Sap from Syracuse (1930) as Senator Powell
The Smiling Lieutenant (1931) as King Adolf XV
24 Hours (1931) as Hector Champion
Girls About Town (1931) as Webster
Touchdown (1931) as Jerome Gehring
No One Man (1932) as Alfred Newbold
Strangers in Love (1932) as Mr. Merrow
One Hour with You (1932) as Police Commissioner
The Broken Wing (1932) as Luther Farley
The Strange Case of Clara Deane (1932) as Richard Ware
Million Dollar Legs (1932) as Mr. Baldwin
Skyscraper Souls (1932) as Charlie Norton
Madame Racketeer (1932) as Warden George Waddell (uncredited)
The Phantom President (1932) as Boss Jim Ronkton
The Big Broadcast (1932) as Clapsaddle
Evenings for Sale (1932) as Henrich Fischer
No Man of Her Own (1932) as Mr. Randall
Hello, Everybody! (1933) as Mr. Blair
A Lady's Profession (1933) as James Garfield
Under the Tonto Ridge (1933) as Weston
A Bedtime Story (1933) as Toy Seller
Sunset Pass (1933) as Judge
Mama Loves Papa (1933) as Mr. Kirkwood
Turn Back the Clock (1933) as Pete Evans
This Day and Age (1933) as Judge Michael Maguire
Love, Honor, and Oh Baby! (1933) as Jasper B. Ogden
Tillie and Gus (1933) as Captain Fogg
Miss Fane's Baby Is Stolen (1934) as MacCready
Journal of a Crime (1934) as Chautard
Many Happy Returns (1934) as Horatio Allen
The Cat's-Paw (1934) as Jake Mayo
Elmer and Elsie (1934) as John Kincaid
Ladies Should Listen (1934) as Joseph Flamberg
She Loves Me Not (1934) as J. Thorval Jones
The Merry Widow (1934) as King Achmed II
College Rhythm (1934) as John P. Stacey
McFadden's Flats (1935) as Mr. Hall
Life Begins at 40 (1935) as Colonel Joseph Ambercrombie
Hold 'Em Yale (1935) as Mr. Van Cleve
Broadway Gondolier (1935) as Music Critic Hayward
Old Man Rhythm (1935) as John Roberts Sr.
The Crusades (1935) as Sancho, King of Navarre
Hollywood Extra Girl (1935, Documentary Short) (uncredited)
Here Comes Cookie (1935) as Harrison Allen
Millions in the Air (1935) as Calvin Keller
The Milky Way (1936) as Wilbur Austin
The Preview Murder Mystery (1936) as Jerome Hewitt
Wife vs. Secretary (1936) as J. D. Underwood
The Princess Comes Across (1936) as Captain Nichols
Early to Bed (1936) as Horace Stanton
Spendthrift (1936) as Uncle Morton Middleton
Three Married Men (1936) as Mr. Carey
On the Avenue (1937) as Commodore Caraway
Waikiki Wedding (1937) as J. P. Todhunter
Hotel Haywire (1937) as I. Ketts
It's Love I'm After (1937) as William West
A Girl with Ideas (1937) as John Morton
Tarzan's Revenge (1938) as Roger Reed
The Adventures of Marco Polo (1938) as Kublai Khan
Hold That Kiss (1938) as Mr. Piermont
Little Miss Broadway (1938) as Fiske
My Lucky Star (1938) as George Cabot Sr.
Hold That Co-ed(1938) as Major Hubert Breckenridge
Straight, Place and Show(1938) as Mr. Drake
Sweethearts (1938) as Benjamin Silver
Thanks for Everything (1938) as Joe Raines
Wife, Husband and Friend (1939) as Major Blair
S.O.S. Tidal Wave (1939) as Uncle Dan Carter
News Is Made at Night (1939) as Clanahan
Smuggled Cargo (1939) as C.P. Franklin
Remember? (1939) as Mr. McIntyre
Village Barn Dance (1940) as Uncle Si
The Return of Frank James (1940) as Judge
Repent at Leisure (1941) as Robert Cornelius 'R.C,' Baldwin
Million Dollar Baby (1941) as Marlin
Sing Another Chorus (1941) as Arthur Peyton
Week-End in Havana (1941) as Walter McCracken
Marry the Boss's Daughter (1941) as J. W. Barrett
The Man Who Came to Dinner (1942) as Dr. E. Bradley
Song of the Islands (1942) as Jefferson Harper Sr.
Yankee Doodle Dandy (1942) as A. L. Erlanger
The Magnificent Dope (1942) as James Roger Barker
Thunder Birds (1942) as Col. Cyrus P. 'Gramps' Saunders
Hello, Frisco, Hello (1943) as Col. Weatherby (uncredited)
Week-End Pass (1944) as Commander "Paps' Bradley
Her Lucky Night (1945) as J.L. Wentworth
Blonde Ransom (1945) as Uncle William Morrison (final film role)

References

External links

1864 births
1945 deaths
American male film actors
American male stage actors
20th-century American male actors
Male actors from Philadelphia
Crozer Theological Seminary alumni